Euchaetes antica is a moth of the family Erebidae. It was described by Francis Walker in 1856. It is found from Arizona and New Mexico in the US, south to Mexico, Nicaragua, Honduras and Guatemala.

The length of the forewing is 13–15 mm for males and 16–20 mm for females.

The larvae feed on Asclepias subverticillata.

References

 Arctiidae genus list at Butterflies and Moths of the World of the Natural History Museum

Phaegopterina
Moths described in 1856